The St. Joe Formation or St. Joe Limestone Member is a geologic formation or member in northern Arkansas, southern Missouri and northeastern Oklahoma. It preserves fossils of the Mississippian subperiod including crinoids, brachiopods, bryozoa, conodonts, blastoids, ostracods and rugose coral.

See also

 List of fossiliferous stratigraphic units in Arkansas
 Paleontology in Arkansas

References

 

Carboniferous geology of Oklahoma
Carboniferous Arkansas
Mississippian Missouri
Carboniferous southern paleotemperate deposits
Carboniferous southern paleotropical deposits